William Pryor Thorne (March 5, 1845 – May 28, 1928) served as the 29th Lieutenant Governor of Kentucky under Governor J. C. W. Beckham from 1903 to 1907.  He was born in Shelby County, Kentucky and died in 1928.

References

1845 births
1928 deaths
Lieutenant Governors of Kentucky
People from Shelby County, Kentucky